Anger is a surname. Notable people with the name include:

People
 Ain Anger (born 1971), Estonian opera bass
Bryan Anger (born 1988), American football player
Darol Anger (born 1953), American violinist
Ed Anger, pseudonymous American columnist
Erling Anger (1909–1999), Norwegian civil servant
Hal Anger (1920–2005), American scientist, inventor of the Anger camera
Louis Anger (1878–1946), American entertainer
Jane Anger (16th century), English author
Kenneth Anger (born 1927), American filmmaker
Matt Anger (born 1963), American tennis player
Per Anger (1913–2002), Swedish diplomat
Roger Anger (1923–2008), French architect
Staffan Anger (born 1943), Swedish politician

Fictional characters
Dirk Anger, fictional character in Marvel Comics' Nextwave